Stößen is a town in the Burgenlandkreis district, in Saxony-Anhalt, Germany. It is situated southeast of Naumburg. It is part of the Verbandsgemeinde ("collective municipality") Wethautal.

Windpark 
Since 2010, there are at  a wind park consisting of 3 Enercon E-126 wind turbines, the most powerful wind turbine in the world. Each of these turbines has a rotor with 126 metres diameter mounted in a height of 135 metres and can generate 7.5 MW.

References

Towns in Saxony-Anhalt
Burgenlandkreis